The 2020–21 Women's England Hockey League season (sponsored by Vitality) was the 2020-21 season of England's field hockey league structure and the England Hockey Women's Championship Cup. The COVID-19 pandemic in the United Kingdom caused severe disruption with the season starting on 19 September 2020, five months later than scheduled and just two weeks after the delayed 2019-20 season had finally ended. However after just five rounds of games the season was suspended during October 2020 due to COVID-19 once again. During March 2021 it became evident that the fixtures could not be fulfilled and the season was cancelled.

The 2020-21 Premier Division would see Surbiton defend the title. Wimbledon (winners of Division 1 South) and Swansea (winners of Division 1 North) joined the division to make an eleven team league instead of ten teams, with Bowdon being relegated. It was the first season since 2011 not to be sponsored by Investec. After five rounds from 19 September until 24 October East Grinstead topped the table before the league was suspended. 

The Championship Cup was consolidated and rearranged as an early Summer tournament. East Grinstead who were leading the Premier Division at the time of its suspension gained consolation by defeating Clifton Robinsons 5-3 in the final.

Regular season

Standings at time of league cancellation

Premier Division

Division One South

Division One North

England Hockey Women's Championship Cup

Quarter-finals

Semi-finals

Final 
Nottingham Hockey Centre

See also
 2020–21 Men's Hockey League season

References

2020–21
England
2020 in English sport
2021 in English sport
Hockey League